Leighton Jordan, (born November 5, 1992) is an American beauty pageant titleholder from Suwanee, Georgia who was named Miss Georgia 2012.

Biography
She won the title of Miss Georgia on June 23, 2012, when she received her crown from outgoing titleholder Michaela Lackey. Jordan's platform is the “Sibling Support Project,” a national program designed to increase peer support and information opportunities for siblings of special needs children. Her older brother suffers from numerous health problems, including deafness, cerebral palsy and epilepsy, inspiring her work with families with special needs children. Her competition talent was a ballet en pointe to “He's a Pirate.” Jordan was home-schooled though high school, and plans to attend college at Georgia State University to study nursing and become a pediatric oncology nurse practitioner.

References

External links

 

Miss America 2013 delegates
1992 births
Living people
People from Suwanee, Georgia
Georgia State University alumni
American beauty pageant winners